Diexi Lake is a lake in Diexi, Mao County, Sichuan, China.

Diexi Lake is a landslide dam-created lake formed in the 1933 Diexi earthquake and covers 3.5 square kilometers. The old town of Diexi sank into this lake. The remnants of the town's watch towers, a temple, stone lions and cliff murals are still visible today.

References

Lakes of China
Bodies of water of Sichuan
Landslide-dammed lakes
1933 establishments in China